Dreamworld was a Swedish Eurodance group consisting of Bella Morel, Fredrik Lenander and Lars Erlandsson. The band were based in Malmö. The voice of Dreamworld was the female vocalist Bella Morel. She also took part to the lyrics writing. All their CDs were released under the label RAIR (Air Chrysalis).

Biography
Dreamworld is best known for their 1995 released club single "Movin' Up" which was their first single. It was rather successful, and a UK Remixes CD followed. Movin' Up was a popular club hit in Europe and it reached #12 on the Australian ARIA Chart later in its release year. It is featured on many compilations and the single sold gold in Australia. The song also gained success among dance clubs in North America peaking at #30 on the US Dance chart in March 1996. It has since been covered by Dannii Minogue (for her "Girl" album) and Mexican artist Paulina Rubio (as "Despiertate" on her "Planeta Paulina" album).

In October 1995 came their second single which is entitled "Unreal". The music video for the single was directed by Patric Ullaeus. A remix CD entitled "The Unreal Remixes" was released later. Their only album, Heaven Sent, was released in 1996. Their two last singles "Everytime I Fall (For Your Eyes)" and "Holdin' On" were more confidential.

In 1997, they decided to stop the band project and they created their own production team, Dreamworld Productions. A*Teens, Supernatural, Lucy Street, Dannii Minogue, Mirah, Infernal, Carina, Paulina Rubio and Jeans were some of the artists that recorded songs written by Dreamworld Productions. They have produced or made remixes for Cartoons, Tiggy, and Los Umbrellos as well.

Discography

Albums 
1996 - Heaven Sent

Singles

References 

Swedish Eurodance groups
Swedish dance music groups
Musical groups established in 1995
Musical groups disestablished in 1997
English-language singers from Sweden